The Aerola Alatus is a Ukrainian mid-wing, single-seat, glider  and motor glider, designed and produced by Aerola of Kyiv.

Design and development
A manufacturer of rigid wing hang gliders, Aerola decided to produce an ultralight sailplane along similar concept lines. The resulting aircraft is offered with and without a retractable engine. The prototype glider was known as the AL-12, with the motorized prototype  designated as the AL-12M. The production versions are the Alatus and Alatus-M, respectively.

The aircraft is made from composites. The landing gear is of a bicycle design, with a main wheel and a nose wheel, plus wing tip skids. The bubble canopy is in one piece and is removable. The light wing loading and low stall speed mean that the aircraft can be flown in the smallest thermals. The wings can be removed for ground transport on top of an automobile, while the fuselage is small enough to fit inside a van or to be secured to a small trailer.

Variants
AL-12
Initial unpowered prototype
AL-12M
Initial powered prototype
Alatus
Conforms to German LTF and LFG requirements.
Alatus-M
Conforms to German LTF and LFG requirements, as well as US FAR 103 Ultralight Vehicles rules. Powered by a pylon-mounted retractable  CorsAir M25Y ES engine that produces a climb rate of 2.0 m/s (400 fpm) and gives an endurance of 1.5 hours. An electric powerplant is also available which provides a half-hour endurance. The Alatus-M can be converted back to the Alatus by removing the powerplant pylon and engine.

Specifications (Alatus)

See also

References

External links
Official website
Official photos of the Alatus and Alatus-M

2000s Ukrainian sailplanes